Vasili, Vasily, Vasilii or Vasiliy (Russian: Василий) is a Russian masculine given name of Greek origin and corresponds to Basil. It may refer to:

Vasili I of Moscow Grand Prince from 1389–1425
Vasili II of Moscow Grand Prince from 1425–1462
Vasili III of Russia Tsar from 1505–1533
Vasili IV of Russia Tsar from 1606–1610
Basil Fool for Christ (1469–1557), also known as Saint Basil, or Vasily Blazhenny
Vasily Alekseyev (1942–2011), Soviet weightlifter
Vasily Arkhipov (1926–1998), Soviet Naval officer in the Cuban Missile Crisis
Vasily Boldyrev (1875–1933), Russian general
Vasily Chapayev (1887–1919), Russian Army commander
Vasily Chuikov (1900–1982), Soviet marschal
Vasily Degtyaryov (1880–1949), Russian weapons designer and Major General
Vasily Dzhugashvili (1921–1962), Stalin's son
Vasili Golovachov (born 1948), Russian science fiction author
Vasily Grossman (1905–1964), Soviet writer and journalist
Vasily Ignatenko (1961–1986), Soviet firefighter in the aftermath of the Chernobyl disaster
Vasilii Alekseevich Iskovskikh (1939–2009), Russian mathematician
Vasyl Ivanchuk (born 1969), Ukrainian chess grandmaster
Wassily Kandinsky (Vasily Kandinsky; 1866–1944), Russian painter and art theorist.
Vasily Karatygin (1802–1880), Russian actor
Vasily Lanovoy (1934–2021), Russian actor
Vasily Livanov (born 1935), Russian actor and screenwriter
Vasily Lobanov (born 1947), Russian composer and pianist
Vasyl Lomachenko (Vasily Lomachenko; born 1988), Ukrainian boxer
Vasily Markovich (born 1955), Belarusian politician
Vasily Nezabitovsky (1824–1883), Ukrainian jurist
Vasily Petrenko (born 1976), Russian conductor
Vasily Podkolzin (born 2001), Russian ice hockey player currently playing for the Vancouver Canucks 
Vasily Seseman (1884–1963), Russian and Lithuanian philosopher
Vasily Smyslov (1921–2010), Soviet chess player
Vasily Tsibliyev (born 1954), Russian cosmonaut
Vasily Zaytsev, Soviet sniper
Vasily Zakharov (born 1934), Soviet culture minister
Vasily Zhdanov (born 1963), Soviet cyclist

Fictional characters
Vasilii, a character from the Twilight book and film series
Vasily Borgov, a character from the novel The Queen's Gambit by Walter Tevis and in the Netflix miniseries of the same title based on the novel
Vasily Petrovych Goloborodko, protagonist of the TV series Servant of the People
Vasily Lantsov, a character from the Grishaverse book series by Leigh Bardugo
Vasily Pavlichenko, a character from Satoru Noda's seinen manga series, Golden Kamuy

See also 
Wassily Chair, 1920s furniture, named after Wassily Kandinsky (''Vasily Kandinsky)
Vasilyev, surname
Vasyl, (Ukrainian: Василь), Ukrainian masculine given name
 (Belarusian: Васіль), Belarusian masculine given name
Vasil (Bulgarian and Macedonian: Васил, Georgian: ვასილ), Bulgarian, Macedonian and Georgian masculine given name
 (Serbian Cyrillic: Васиљ), Serbian masculine given name
Vasilisa (name), the feminine form of the name

Russian masculine given names